African Jim, also known as Jim Comes to Jo'burg, is a 1949 South African film, directed by Donald Swanson and produced by Eric Rutherford. It features Daniel Adnewmah, Dolly Rathebe, The African Inkspots, Sam Maile, and Dan Twala. It is notable as the Republic of South Africa's first African feature-length film.

Plot synopsis
Jim (Daniel Adnewmah) leaves his tribal area to seek his fortune in Johannesburg. As soon as he arrives, three gangsters mug him. When he regains consciousness, a friendly night watchman named Charlie (Dan Twala) takes care of him. With the watchman's help, Jim gets a job in a nightclub as a waiter. He is offered the chance to sing on stage with the club's female star, Julie (Dolly Rathebe). Just before his debut, he recognizes the gangsters who mugged him and overhears them plotting a robbery. Jim has to decide how to stop the crime and still be in time to perform.

Cast
Daniel Adnewmah as Jim
Dolly Rathebe as Julie
Dan Twala as Charlie

References

External links
 "African Jim (1949)", IMDb.

1940s English-language films
1949 films
South African drama films
1940s musical drama films
South African black-and-white films
1949 drama films
English-language South African films